Francisco de Zapata y Mendoza (1599–1655) was a Roman Catholic prelate and Bishop of Coria (1649–1655).

He was born in Madrid, Spain.
On 13 September 1649, he was appointed during the papacy of Pope Innocent X as Bishop of Coria.
He served as Bishop of Coria until his death in 1655.

References

External links and additional sources
 (for Chronology of Bishops) 
 (for Chronology of Bishops) 

17th-century Roman Catholic bishops in Spain
Bishops appointed by Pope Innocent X
1599 births
1655 deaths